Carroll McCurdy (January 6, 1917 – October 12, 2003) was an American politician who served in the Iowa Senate from the 14th district from 1957 to 1961.

He died on October 12, 2003, in Oskaloosa, Iowa at age 86.

References

1917 births
2003 deaths
Democratic Party Iowa state senators